Visit Chaicharoen is a Thai basketball player. He competed in the men's tournament at the 1956 Summer Olympics.

References

Year of birth missing (living people)
Living people
Visit Chaicharoen
Visit Chaicharoen
Basketball players at the 1956 Summer Olympics
Place of birth missing (living people)